Yannick Thoelen (born 18 July 1990) is Belgian footballer who plays as a goalkeeper for Mechelen in the Belgian Pro League.

On 24 July 2019, he returned to Mechelen, signing a 3-year contract.

References

External links
 Guardian Football
 

Belgian footballers
1990 births
Living people
K.V. Mechelen players
Lommel S.K. players
K.A.A. Gent players
Belgian Pro League players
Challenger Pro League players
Association football goalkeepers